Angie Reed is an American electronica vocalist and multiinstrumentalist, now living in Berlin.

After playing in Angie et ses Tigres, she joined Stereo Total at the age of 21 as a bassist and vocalist. She left the band to pursue a solo career in 2000. Her debut solo concept album, Presents the Best of Barbara Brockhaus, recorded at Chicks on Speed Records and produced by Patric Catani and Bomb 20, was released in 2003. Angie toured most of Europe as well as Istanbul, Tokyo and Moscow until 2005, when her second album, XYZ Frequency was released.

She worked with a lot of well-known bands and musicians like Die Goldenen Zitronen, Gonzales or Namosh.  Angie writes the lyrics, sings the vocals to her records, plays most of the instruments and does some of the production work. Her music ranges from pure electronica to rock. Her shows are often accompanied by video and images that she designed.

She appeared in the films Ladybug (2006)  as Veronica Neat and in archive footage in Übriggebliebene ausgereifte Haltungen (2007), a German documentary.

Discography
 Presents the Best of Barbara Brockhaus (2003)
 XYZ Frequency (2005)

External links
 Interview in Exberliner Magazine

Living people
1976 births
21st-century American singers
21st-century American women singers